The 2012 European Road Championships were held in Goes, Netherlands, between 9 and 12 August 2012. The event consisted of a road race and a time trial for men and women under 23 and juniors. The championships were regulated by the European Cycling Union.

Schedule

Time trial 
Thursday 9 August
 10 h 00 Men juniors, 24.9 km
 15 h 00 Women under-23, 24.9 km

Friday 10 August
 10 h 00 Women juniors, 14.8 km
 15 h 00 Men under-23, 24.9 km

Road Race 
Saturday 11 August
 9 h 00 Men juniors, 129 km
 14 h 00 Women under-23, 129 km

Sunday 12 August
 10 h 00 Women juniors, 80 km
 13 h 00 Men under-23, 172 km

Results

Medal table

References 
 Results uec-federation.eu

External links 
  Official website

European Road Championships by year
International cycle races hosted by the Netherlands
European Road Championships, 2012
2012 in Dutch sport
Cycling in Zeeland
Sport in Goes